Zenkerella wintoni is in extinct species of rodent from the family Zenkerellidae. It is known from a single mandible from Songhor, Kenya dated to the Early Miocene. 

Zenkarella wintoni along with its living relative have a highly derived molar morphology characterized by a simplified trilophodont pattern that is very different from that of other anomaluroids.

References

Anomaluromorpha
Miocene rodents
Miocene mammals of Africa